SS Amasa Stone was a  Great Lakes freighter that was sunk as a breakwater in 1965, Charlevoix, Michigan. She was built for the Mesaba Steamship Company by the Detroit Shipbuilding Company of Wyandotte, Michigan. She was launched on March 25, 1905, as hull #158. She was powered by an  triple expansion steam engine and two scotch marine boilers.

History
On June 18, 1905 Amasa Stone was downbound with a cargo of iron ore bound from Duluth, Minnesota to Lake Erie when she rammed and sank the steamer  in heavy fog. Etruria was upbound with coal from Toledo, Ohio for Superior, Wisconsin. Amasa Stone punched a hole in starboard side abreast of the ninth cargo hatch; crew members of Etruria were rescued from lifeboats by the steamer Maritana. Amasa Stone was traveling at full speed at the time of the collision.

In 1913 Amasa Stone was merged in the fleet owned by Interlake Steamship Company. On July 24, 1924 Amasa Stone collided with steamer Merton E. Farr in fog off Ile Parisienne, Lake Superior; the amount of money it cost to repair the damage was $7,000. On October 22, 1929, the Stone made it through the same storm that sank the train ferry Milwaukee, the Stone was downbound with 10,000 tons of coal for Ludington, Michigan at the time of the sinking. In 1938 she had new boilers installed. In 1952 she was re-powered with a 1,800 horsepower, 5-cylinder Skinner uniflow engine.

Breakwater in Charlevoix

Amasa Stone made her last trip in 1959 and in 1960 was decommissioned and laid up. in 1964 she was sold to the Marine Salvage Ltd. of Port Colborne, Ontario and in 1965 sold on to the Medusa Portland Cement Company of Charlevoix, Michigan  where, joined by the steamer , she would function as a dock and breakwater. Both ships were stripped down to their hulls and sunk at the port entrance in Charlevoix, where they remain to this day.

References

Great Lakes freighters
1905 ships
Steamships of the United States
Ships built in Wyandotte, Michigan
Ships sunk as breakwaters
Merchant ships of the United States
Ships powered by a triple expansion steam engine
Shipwrecks of the Michigan coast